Jutahy Magalhães Júnior (born October 14, 1955) is a Brazilian politician, affiliated with the Brazilian Social Democracy Party (PSDB). He was a state deputy and is in his sixth term as a federal deputy. In 2016, he voted in favor of the impeachment process of then President Dilma Rousseff. In April 2017 he voted in favor of Labor Reform. In August 2017, he voted in favor of the process calling for the opening of an investigation by then President Michel Temer.

In the 2018 elections, he was a candidate for the position of senator, but he was in 4th place with about 8% of the valid votes.

References

Brazilian politicians
1955 births
Living people